Shivakant Shukla (born 26 January 1986) is an Indian first-class cricketer who played for Railways.

References

External links
 

1986 births
Living people
Indian cricketers
Railways cricketers
Cricketers from Allahabad